Riverbend Correctional Facility (RBCF) is a privately operated, medium-security prison for men, owned and operated by the GEO Group under contract with the Georgia Department of Corrections.  The facility was built in 2011 in Milledgeville, Baldwin County, Georgia.

The maximum capacity of the prison is 1588 inmates.

References

Prisons in Georgia (U.S. state)
Buildings and structures in Baldwin County, Georgia
GEO Group
2011 establishments in Georgia (U.S. state)